Arthur "Snowy" Justice (1902–1977) was an Australian rugby league footballer, coach and administrator. He was a rugged  for the St George Dragons who made state and national representative appearances in the late 1920s. Later he was a club administrator, national selector and league judiciary Chairman.

Club career

A pioneer player with the St George Dragons, he made his first grade debut in the club's second season in the NSWRFL. He captained the club in their maiden (and unsuccessful) Grand final appearance in season 1930 against the Western Suburbs Magpies. This was the first ever Grand Final played to determine the premiership winner. In season 1932 when his Kangaroo tourist partner Harry Kadwell was captain-coach at St George, Justice took over the captaincy when Kadwell's  season was ended with a broken leg.

Representative career
An uncompromising player and relentless fighter  Justice first represented for New South Wales in 1925 and went on to make a total of 25 appearances for his state.

Justice made his Test debut for Australia in the first match of Ashes series against England in 1928 and played in all three Tests of that series. He made further Test appearances on the 1929–30 Kangaroo tour of Great Britain - the scoreless draw in the third test and the subsequent fourth test, as well as appearing in a tour match against Wales. Arthur Justice is listed on the Australian Players Register as Kangaroo No. 139.

Post playing, administrative career and accolades
Justice coached the St. George Dragons in two seasons 1936 and 1947. He was an Australian representative selector for the 1952-53 Kangaroos and was chairman of the NSWRFL judiciary. He was also instrumental in enticing Frank Facer to St.George in 1947.

He then enjoyed a long career as Secretary-Manager of the St George Leagues Club initially at the club's first premises at the head of Rocky Point Road, Kogarah and then from 1963 when the current Leagues Club was opened on the Princes Highway at Carlton up until his death.

He was awarded Life Membership of the St. George Dragons club in 1944.

Together with the Balmain administrator Latchem Robinson, Justice's former representative playing peer, he was one of the seminal forces behind the establishment of the Club Managers' Association of Australia at its foundation in 1964. Justice was awarded a Life Membership of that organisation for outstanding service to the club industry.

Death
Arthur Justice died on 16 December 1977 aged 75.

References

Footnotes

Published sources
 Andrews, Malcolm (2006) The ABC of Rugby League Austn Broadcasting Corpn, Sydney
 Whiticker, Alan & Hudson, Glen (2006) The Encyclopedia of Rugby League Players, Gavin Allen Publishing, Sydney

1902 births
1977 deaths
Australia national rugby league team players
Australian rugby league administrators
Australian rugby league coaches
Australian rugby league players
Rugby league hookers
Rugby league players from Sydney
St. George Dragons captains
St. George Dragons coaches
St. George Dragons players